The Legia Training Center is the sports venue and the training center of Legia Warsaw in Książenice. Legia Warsaw II plays home matches in the center, and the first team also plays friendly matches. It is called "the most modern training center in this part of Europe".

Infrastructure 
 8 pitches
 First team zone
 Football Academy
 Offices of the sports division and other club departments
 LegiaLab Research and Development Center
 Surfaces for sports startups
 Publicly accessible recreational and sports infrastructure for residents

References

Football venues in Poland
Sports venues in Masovian Voivodeship
Grodzisk Mazowiecki County
Sports venues completed in 2020
2020 establishments in Poland